Benjamin Smith Lyman (11 December 1835 – 30 August 1920) was an American mining engineer, surveyor, and an amateur linguist and anthropologist. He was also a promoter of vegetarianism.

Biography

Benjamin Smith Lyman was born in Northampton, Massachusetts. He graduated from Harvard University in 1855. After working briefly as a school teacher, he worked as an assistant to his wife's uncle on a topographical and geological survey of Broad Top Mountain in Pennsylvania, which spurred his interest in geology and mining engineering. He studied for a year at the Ecole Imperiale des Mines in Paris (1859–60), then took a practical course at the Freiberg Mining Academy in Freiberg, Saxony (1861–62). Upon returning to the United States, Lyman opened an office as a consulting mining engineer in Philadelphia and worked on surveys from Pennsylvania to Nova Scotia, Arizona and California.

In 1870, Lyman surveyed oil fields in the Punjab region for the Public Works Department of the government of British India, during which he developed an interest in the Far East.

In 1872 he was hired by the Japanese government to survey the coal and oil deposits of Hokkaidō and along the Sea of Japan coastline of Honshu. His survey identified the most promising coal fields for Hokkaidō's eventually successful coal industry as well as reporting on progress in the reclamation of waste land; the nature of the soil in various districts; the customs, physique, and folklore of the Ainu people; useful ores and stones; the development of hydraulic power; importation of foreign capital; and the advantage of cooperation with foreign concerns in the mining industry. He stayed on in Japan from 1873 to 1879 as chief geologist and mining engineer to the Meiji government. While in Japan, he educated many Japanese in western techniques for natural resource surveys, and published the first geological map of Hokkaidō in 1876. Many of Lyman's Japanese assistants became proficient surveyors and some of them distinguished geologists, although his relations with the Hokkaidō Colonization Office were often strained. Before leaving Japan, he encouraged his assistants to form the Geological Society of Japan and to publish a journal. He donated his house to the new society for use as its headquarters.

In his study of the Japanese language, Lyman noticed that a necessary condition for the voicing (technically rendaku) of the initial obstruent of the second word in a compound is that the word contain no voiced obstruent in a later syllable. (A sufficient condition for predicting rendaku is not known.) This constraint has come to be known as "Lyman's Law".

After Lyman returned to Northampton, he spent the next several years working on his reports, which he published at his own expense. He attended meetings of technical and scientific societies as well as the Oriental Club of Philadelphia, and held a reception each year on the birthday of the Emperor of Japan. Although he officially retired in 1895, Lyman made a journey (1906–07) to survey the coal lands near Mount Lantauan on Cebu in the Philippines, for a New York City company that was building a railroad there. On the way, he visited his former assistants in Japan. He hoped to re-visit Japan on his return trip, but was prevented by a long bout with dysentery.

He died 30 August 1920, aged 84, in Cheltenham, Pennsylvania.

Many of his personal journals, books, maps and papers are preserved in the “Benjamin Smith Lyman Collection” at the University of Massachusetts Amherst and the "Benjamin Smith Lyman papers" (call number Mss.B.L982) at the American Philosophical Society. He was elected to the APS in 1869.

Vegetarianism

Lyman, a vegetarian for most of his life, published a scholarly cookbook of vegetarian recipes in 1917 at the age of 81. Lyman travelled extensively throughout China, Europe, Japan and the United States. Based on his experiences from his travels he adopted a vegetarian diet in 1864. He was a vegetarian for 56 years of his life, until his death at the age of 84. He was described of believing in vegetarianism "with almost religious devotion."

Partial listing of works
1868 – Telescopic Measurement in Surveying
1870 – General Report on the Punjab Oil Lands
1873 – Topography of the Punjab Oil region
1874 – Preliminary Report on the First Season's Work on the Geological Survey of Yesso
1877 – A General Report on the Geology of Yesso
1877 – Geological Survey of the Oil Lands of Japan
General Report on the Punjab Oil Lands  
1878 – Notes on Japanese Grammar
1879 –  Geological Survey of Japan: Reports of Progress for 1878 and 1879. Tookei: Public Works Department.   OCLC: 13342563
1892 – Japanese Swords
1893 – The Great Mesozoic Fault in New Jersey
1894 – Change from surd to sonant in Japanese compounds
1894 – Age of Newark Brownstone
1894 – Some New Red Horizons
1897 – Against Adopting the Metric System
1900 – Movements of Ground Water
1902 – The Original Southern Limit of Pennsylvania Anthracite Beds
1904 – Some Hindoo Marriage Ceremonies
1907 – The Philippines
1909 – Need of Instrument Surveying in Practical Geology
1912 – Natural History Morality
1915 – A Practical Rational Alphabet
1916 – Natural Morality
1917 – Vegetarian Diet and Dishes

References

External links
Benjamin Smith Lyman Collection at University of Massachusetts Amherst
Benjamin Smith Lyman Papers at American Philosophical Society

1835 births
1920 deaths
Amateur anthropologists
American cookbook writers
Amateur linguists
American mining engineers
American geologists
American non-fiction writers
American vegetarianism activists
Harvard University alumni
People from Northampton, Massachusetts
Foreign advisors to the government in Meiji-period Japan
Foreign educators in Japan
American expatriates in Japan
American expatriates in Germany
American expatriates in France
Vegetarian cookbook writers